Ormos Egialis is also called Aegiali and is the second port of Amorgos. It is set in a large sweeping bay, providing a view from Tholaria and the Aegialis Hotel above. There are frequent ferries to and from Piraeus, as well as a daily ferry to Naxos.

Amorgos